Sandy was originally recorded in 1969 for Gary Usher's Together Records, a venture that was brief enough that the label collapsed before the album (along with several others) could be released.

There are three versions of this on CD, each one featuring different bonus tracks. The original release by Poptones featured just one bonus track, an instrumental version of "Once I Knew a Little Dog". The Japanese version features three bonus tracks. All three tracks are demos, and two of the songs weren't part of the original album. The most recent release, by Rev-Ola, contains 13 bonus tracks.

Track listing
"I Just Don't Know How to Say Goodbye"
"Spell on Me"
"The Hills of Vermont"
"The Good 'Ol Goodtimes"
"Come Softly"
"On and on She Goes"
"Cecily"
"Do Unto Others"
"Once I Knew a Little Dog"
"Baby Listen"
"Goody Goodbye"

Sandy Salisbury albums
2001 albums
Albums produced by Keith Olsen
Albums produced by Curt Boettcher